Aleksey Gorlachov (born 6 May 1981) is a Russian luger. He competed in the men's singles event at the 2002 Winter Olympics.

References

External links
 

1981 births
Living people
Russian male lugers
Olympic lugers of Russia
Lugers at the 2002 Winter Olympics
People from Bratsk
Sportspeople from Irkutsk Oblast